Nomu is a Papuan language of Morobe Province, Papua New Guinea.

References

Languages of Morobe Province
Huon languages